Frikkadel is a traditional Afrikaner dish consisting of usually baked, but sometimes deep-fried, meatballs prepared with onion, bread, eggs, vinegar and spices. These meatballs can be served hot or cold. Many recipes have put modern twist on this traditional recipe such as alternating chicken and lamb with the traditional beef staple. Frikkadel are also popular in Sri Lankan cuisine by way of the Burgher people.

The Afrikaner Frikkadel 
Traditionally, frikkadels are eaten alone or with a sauce served with mashed potatoes, rice and pasta.

Danish variant 
The Danish Frikadeller is a similar meatball, made of pork.

See also 
 Frikadelle (Danish and German)
 Kofte (Persian and Indian)
 Perkedel (Indonesian and Malaysian)
 List of African dishes
 List of meatball dishes

References

External links
A typical recipe

South African cuisine
Meatballs
Baked foods

af:Frikkadel